The 2021–22 season is SV Sandhausen's 106th season in existence and the club's 10th consecutive season in the 2. Bundesliga, the second tier of German football. The club will also participate in the DFB-Pokal.

Background and pre-season

Sanshausen finished the 2020–21 season in 15th place, one point above the relegation play-off place and three points above automatic relegation. Joint managers Stefan Kulovits and Gerhard Kleppinger, who were appointed on 15 February after the dismissal of Michael Schiele, signed a contract with the club for the new season in May 2021.

Friendly matches

Competitions

2. Bundesliga

League table

Matches

DFB-Pokal

Transfers

Transfers in

Loans in

Transfers out

Loans out

Notes

References

Sandhausen
SV Sandhausen seasons